Hasan Kandi (also Romanized as Ḩasan Kandī; also known as Ḩasan Kandī-ye Seyyed Lor) is a village in Qarah Quyun-e Jonubi Rural District, Qarah Quyun District, Showt County, West Azerbaijan Province, Iran. At the 2006 census, its population was 19, in 7 families.

References 

Populated places in Showt County